Austroeupatorium is a genus of plants native primarily to South America, including herbaceous perennials and shrubs.  The native range is focused on eastern South America and extends as far north as Panama and Trinidad and as far west as Bolivia.

Species 
The species A. inulifolium is native to South America, from Panama to Argentina.  It has been introduced to Sri Lanka, Indonesia, Taiwan, the Philippines, and Sumatra.  It is a highly invasive species in the Knuckles Range in Sri Lanka. It can be either a herbaceous perennial or a shrub and can grow up to two meters tall.  It particularly colonizes disturbed areas such as roadsides and fields prepared for planting.

 Accepted species
 Austroeupatorium albescens (Gardner) R.M.King & H.Rob.	 - Goiás, Brazilia 
 Austroeupatorium apensis (Chodat) R.M.King & H.Rob.	 - Paraguay, southern Brazil
 Austroeupatorium chaparense (B.L.Rob.) R.M.King & H.Rob. - Bolivia
 Austroeupatorium cordato-acuminatum H.Rob. - Brazil
 Austroeupatorium decemflorum (DC.) R.M.King & H.Rob. - Colombia, Ecuador, Peru, Bolivia
 Austroeupatorium entreriense (Hieron.) R.M.King & H.Rob. - Uruguay
 Austroeupatorium inulaefolium (Kunth) R.M.King & H.Rob. - Panama, Trinidad & Tobago, Venezuela, Colombia, Ecuador, Peru, Brazil, Uruguay
 Austroeupatorium laetevirens (Hook. & Arn.) R.M.King & H.Rob. - Paraguay, southern Brazil, northeastern Argentina
 Austroeupatorium morii R.M.King & H.Rob. - Bahia, Espirito Santo
 Austroeupatorium neglectum (B.L.Rob.) R.M.King & H.Rob. - Espirito Santo, Paraná, Minas Gerais, São Paulo
 Austroeupatorium patens (D.Don ex Hook. & Arn.) R.M.King & H.Rob. - Chile
 Austroeupatorium paulinum (DC.) R.M.King & H.Rob. - Amazonas
 Austroeupatorium petrophilum (B.L.Rob.) R.M.King & H.Rob. - Rio de Janeiro
 Austroeupatorium picturatum (Malme) R.M.King & H.Rob.	 - Paraná, Santa Catarina, northeastern Argentina
 Austroeupatorium rosmarinaceum (Cabrera & Vittet) R.M.King & H.Rob. - Paraná, Rio Grande do Sul
 Austroeupatorium silphiifolium (Mart.) R.M.King & H.Rob. - Bolivia, Paraguay, Bahia, Paraná, Minas Gerais, Brazilia, Goiás

References 

Eupatorieae
Asteraceae genera